Baron Latham, of Hendon in the County of Middlesex, is a title in the Peerage of the United Kingdom. It was created in 1942 for the Labour politician Charles Latham. He was Leader of the London County Council from 1940 to 1947. , the title is held by his grandson, the second Baron, who succeeded in 1970. He is the elder twin son of the Hon. Francis Charles Allman Latham (d. 1959). Lord Latham lives in Australia.

Barons Latham (1942)
Charles Latham, 1st Baron Latham (1888–1970)
Dominic Charles Latham, 2nd Baron Latham (b. 1954)

The heir presumptive is the present holder's twin brother Anthony Latham (b. 1954).

Arms

References

Baronies in the Peerage of the United Kingdom
Noble titles created in 1942